Raghunath Manet is a French classical musician/music composer and dancer/choreographer, writer, film maker and actor, born in the Union Territory of Puducherry. He is trained in Bharathanatyam and plays the Veena, a Carnatic instrument. He has collaborated with Gilberto Gil, Aldo Brizzi, American Jazz musician Archie Shepp, American dancer Carolyn Carlson, French performers such as Richard Galliano,  Didier Lockwood and Michel Portal and Indian musician Dr Balamurali Krishna and Drums Sivamani.

Raghunath Manet has performed all over the world. He has appeared at special events for Cartier, Louis Vuitton, Hermès, Chanel, Lagerfeld and other iconic brands.
In 2017 Dr. Manet received the Pravasi Bharatiya Samman Award (PBSA) 2017 presented by the President of India during the Pravasi Bharatiya Divas celebrations in Bengaluru, recognizing Dr. Manet’s contributions promoting Indian arts and culture in France. Other accolades include the "Officier des Arts et des Lettres" (2016) and the "Chevalier des Arts et des Lettres" from the French Ministry of Culture, the GOPIO Community Service Award in Jaipur, India (2011), and the Best Performer Award during the 2014 Chennai Music and Dance Festival.

Raghunath Manet has acted in several films : “Noni, le fruit de l’espoir” by Alain Williams with Robert Hossein, “Diamant Noir” by Arthur Harari, “Le journal d’un séducteur” by Daniel Dubroux with Jean-Pierre Léaud and Chiarra Mastroianni, and “Perduto Amor” by Franco Battiato.  His work as a filmmaker includes “Dance of Shiva” (documentary film 1H15mn), “Karma” (short film), “Yoga, the 7th Chakra” (short film), “The Bayadères of Pondicherry” (documentary film) and “Réincarnation/rebirth” (mobile phone film).

Performances 

2022 : performed in Amor Azul with Gilberto Gil & Aldo Brizzi
2021 : Festival de Robion "Goita Govinda"
2020 : Temple to Stage for Monte-Carlo Sporting Club Awards
2017: Veena Concert au Petit Palais-Paris
2016: duo with Jérôme Pinget
2014: duo with Jasser Haj Youssef
2013: duo with Dr Balamurali Krishna
2012: duo with Didier Lockwood
2011: duo with Richard Galliano
2011: duo with Didier Lockwood
2008 (New Morning Paris): Dance & Indian music with Archie Shepp
2007: Tri Murti ou 7 Dances of Shiva, création with Michel Portal
2006: duo with Carolyn Carlson "Lille 3000"
2005: Bollywood Ballet festival d'Avignon 
2004: album Karnatik with Dr Balamurali Krishna (MK2)
2003: Pondichéry, with Indra Rajan in Opéra-Bastille.

Filmography

Dance of Shiva, movie of Raghunath Manet and Didier Bellocq (2018)
Karma, short film of Raghunath Manet and Ashok (2017)
Perduto amor, movie of Franco Battiato (2003)
Pondichéry, dance & music
Chidambaram, Raghunath Manet & l'Opéra-Bastille
 Veena Concert  "Evening Ragas"
Omkara, dance & music with Didier Lockwood
Dance of Shiva, 1st documentary film by Raghunath Manet & Didier Bellocq presented in Festival of Cannes 2013

Discography

Veena Dreams, Raghunath Manet, 2022
“Holos”,  Raghunath Manet & Aldo Brizzi, 2020
Karma, Music of Veena - Raghunath Manet 2017
Tanjore, Raghunath Manet - 2015
Babaji Dreams, with Drunms Sivamani & Raghunath Manet 2014 
Great Maestros of India, Music of Veena - Raghunath Manet - 2013
Devadasi, Music of bharata natyam - Raghunath Manet - 2012
Omkara, Raghunath Manet & Didier Lockwood - Dreyfus 2010
Karnatic, with Dr Balamurali Krishna & Raghunath Manet 2009 
Bollywood Ballet, Raghunath Manet - Dreyfus 2006
Anjali, Music of bharata natyam - Raghunath Manet - 2005
Kuravane, Music of bharata natyam - Raghunath Manet - 2004
Karaikkudi, Raghunath Manet chez M10 2000
Shiva, Music of bharata natyam - Raghunath Manet - M10 2000
Pondichéry, Raghunath Manet - Frémaux 1997
Veena Recital II, (Double Album) Raghunath Manet / Frémaux 1996
Music & Dance, (Double Album) Raghunath Manet  Frémaux 1995
Veena Recital I, Raghunath Manet (Double Album CD) 1994- Night & Day 
+ 14 CD Raghunath veena

Books/livres de Raghunath Manet

Ode au dieu bleu (Traduction Gita Govinda),  Editions "Tala Sruti" (préface Aldo Brizzi) 2022
L'Inde en Guadeloupe Editions "Tala Sruti" (préface Jean Hira) 2018
Shiva et ses 7 danses Editions "Tala Sruti" (Préface Jean-Claude Carrière)- 2011
La musique carnatique, préface de Didier Lockwood-Barbizon fev 2001
Du temple à la scène Editions "Tala Sruti" (Preface Carolyn Carlson) 1999
Les Bayadères du temple de Villenour Editions "Tala Sruti" (préface Professeur Alain Danielou)1993.

Awards/Recompenses

Pravasi Bharatiya Samman Award (PBSA) 2017, Dr Raghunath Manet is conferred "Pravasi Bharatiya Samman Awards (PBSA) 2017" from the Hon'ble President of India for his contribution to promote Indian arts and culture in France. 
 Officier des Arts et des Lettres, in 2016 from the French Ministry of Culture. 
Chevalier des Arts et des Lettres, in 2005 from the French Ministry of Culture.
GOPIO Community Service Award, in 2011 from GOPIO America in Jaipur.

References

 For more information 
  https://web.archive.org/web/20071013121041/http://artists-india.com/resume/raghunath_manet.php

Living people
People from Pondicherry
Musicians from Puducherry
Veena players
Year of birth missing (living people)